Allopeplus cordifer is a species of beetle in the family Cerambycidae, the only species in the genus Allopeplus.

References

Trachyderini
Monotypic Cerambycidae genera